Cotterdale is a small side dale and hamlet on the north side of Wensleydale in North Yorkshire, England.
The dale lies to the west of Great Shunner Fell.  It is drained by East Gill and West Gill, which between them have nine waterfalls.  They join to form Cotterdale Beck, which flows over three more waterfalls, including Cotter Force, below which the beck joins the River Ure.

The place name is thought to be derived from the Old Norse kotar, meaning "huts".

An Iron Age sword, with bronze scabbard, was found in Cotterdale, and is now in the British Museum.

References

External links 

Yorkshire Dales
Wensleydale
Villages in North Yorkshire